Scott Henderson (born 10 September 1969) is a Scottish professional golfer.

Henderson was born in Aberdeen. He worked as an engineer in the oil industry before turning professional in 1992.

Having won his place on the European Tour at the 1996 final qualifying school, Henderson was named as the Sir Henry Cotton Rookie of the Year in 1997. He also finished inside the top 100 on the European Tour Order of Merit the following season, but lost his card at the end of 1999. Having failed on many occasions to regain his playing privileges via qualifying school, except for two seasons on the second tier Challenge Tour, he has relied mainly on invitations since then.

Professional wins (3)

Other wins (3)
1994 Scottish Assistants' Championship
1996 Northern Open
2008 Carnegie Invitational (Tartan Tour)

Results in major championships

Note: Henderson only played in The Open Championship.

CUT = missed the half-way cut
"T" = tied

Team appearances
PGA Cup (representing Great Britain and Ireland): 2013

External links

Scottish male golfers
European Tour golfers
Sportspeople from Aberdeen
1969 births
Living people